Medernach is a town and commune in eastern Luxembourg. It is part of the canton of Diekirch, which is part of the district of Diekirch.

Since 2011, Medernach has merged with Ermsdorf to become the "Aerenzdallgemeng" (commune Vallée de l'Ernz, Ernztalgemeinde).

Former commune
The former commune consisted of the villages:

 Medernach
 Marxberg
 Ousterbur
 Pletschette
 Savelborn - part of the farm belongs to the commune of Waldbillig
 Kitzebur

Attractions 
From 1987-2015 Medernach was home to an aerodrome

There is a monument commemorating the defense of the town by American soldiers during the winter of 1944–1945.

The parish church, built in a neo-Romanesque style in 1806, has been a national monument since 2004. It houses the Baroque altar from the (now defunct) church of the Franciscan friars of Diekirch, dated 1712, as well as a series of the Stations of the Cross.
Every year, the local produce exhibition is the first weekend of September.

References

Diekirch (canton)
Former communes of Luxembourg
Towns in Luxembourg

lb:Gemeng Miedernach